The name Carina has been used in the Philippines by PAGASA in the Western Pacific.

 Severe Tropical Storm Talim (2012) (T1205, 06W, Carina)
 Tropical Storm Nida (2016) (T1604, 07W, Carina) - struck Philippines
 Tropical Depression Carina (2020) (Carina)

The name Carina was also used for one tropical cyclone in the Southwest Indian Ocean.
 Cyclone Carina (2006)

See also 
 Tropical Storm Karina

Pacific typhoon set index articles
South-West Indian Ocean cyclone set index articles